Jane Menelaus (born 1959) is an Australian actress who trained at the Central School of Speech and Drama in London, England.

Stage
Jane Menelaus has worked with both the South Australian and Melbourne Theatre Companies.  Her stage work has included appearance in the Shakespeare plays, The Winter's Tale with the State Theatre Company of South Australia in 1987 (at The Playhouse in Adelaide, South Australia), and Troilus and Cressida (at the Old Museum Building in 1989).  A fellow cast member, for both these productions, was Geoffrey Rush.

As well as a busy acting schedule with other plays, Jane Menelaus appeared in an ongoing production of The Importance of Being Earnest as Gwendolen Fairfax, with Geoffrey Rush as John Worthing.  The play's popularity is shown by the fact that the production lasted over a period from 1988 to 1992, and was televised by the ABC.

Television

TELEVISION
{|class="wikitable"
|-
! Title
! Year
! Role
! Type 
|-
| 1984
| Special Squad
| Guest role: Penny Young
| TV series, 1 episode
|-
| 1985
| ''On Location with 'Robbery Under Arms| Herself - Actress
| TV special
|-
| 1985
| Robbery Under Arms
| Recurring role: Aileen
| TV miniseries, 2 episodes
|-
| 1985
| A Thousand Skies
| Recurring role: Thelma McKenna
| TV miniseries, 3 episodes
|-
| 1985
| A Country Practice
| Guest role: Stephanie Hughes
| TV series, 2 episodes
|-
| 1986
| Body Business
| Lead role: Victoria
| TV miniseries, 2 episodes
|-
| 1986;1990
| The Flying Doctors
| Guest role: Rose Langford
| TV series, 1 episode
|-
| 1990
| The Flying Doctors
| Guest role: Mrs. Windsor
| TV series, 1 episode
|-
| 1990
| The Importance of Being Earnest
| Recurring role: Gwendolen Fairfax
| ABC Teleplay
|-
| 1992
| Phoenix
| Guest role: Jenny Hanson
| ABC TV series, 1 episode
|-
| 1994
| Blue Heelers
| Guest role: Helen Burns
| TV series, 1 episode
|-
| 1994-1995
| Janus
| Recurring role: Jenny Hanson
| ABC TV series, 6 episodes
|-
| 1997
| The Movie Show
| Herself
| ABC TV series, 1 episode
|-
| 2002;2004
| Kath & Kim
| Guest roles: Jane / Bridal Shop Proprietor
| ABC TV series, 2 episodes
|-
| 2013
| Being Brendo
| Guest role: Pam Strickland
| TV series, 1 episode
|}

FilmographyFILM'''

Personal life
Since 1988, Menelaus has been married to Geoffrey Rush.  They have a daughter, Angelica (born 1992), and a son, James (born 9 September 1995). In 2003, she had surgery for breast cancer.

References

External links 

 Jane Menelaus photo and information – "Phoenix" and "Janus" cast
Jane Menelaus – stage acting credits
"The Winter's Tale" – The Playhouse, Adelaide (1987)
"Troilus and Cressida" – Old Museum Building, Brisbane (1989)

Australian television actresses
Australian film actresses
Australian stage actresses
Place of birth missing (living people)
Alumni of the Royal Central School of Speech and Drama
Living people
1959 births